John Sullivan (born 6 January 1991) is an Irish association football coach and former professional player who is the first team coach at Women's National League club DLR Waves.

Career
Sullivan signed for Hamilton Academical on 2 January 2009 from Irish side Bohemians. He made his professional debut on 26 December 2009, in a Scottish Premier League match against Celtic. Sullivan left Hamilton at the end of the 2009–10 season to return to Ireland, spending the 2010 season with Limerick, before moving to Shelbourne in time for the 2011 season.

Sullivan left Shelbourne on 30 July 2012.

Sullivan signed for Dundalk on 8 January 2013.

On 12 December 2015, Sullivan signed for Galway United for the 2016 season. On 4 March 2016, in the season opener against St Patrick's Athletic at Richmond Park, Sullivan made his debut and scored an 83rd-minute header in a 3–1 win. Despite the great start to his time at Galway United, it was announced on 28 June 2016 that Sullivan had left the club citing travel issues.

Sullivan re-signed for Bray Wanderers in July 2016. He left Bray after their 2018 season, spending 2019 playing with amateur teams Bluebell United and Crumlin United. He then stopped playing at 28 years old and joined DLR Waves as a coach for their 2020 season.

References

External links

 Weltfußball
Soccerway Profile

1991 births
Living people
Association footballers from Dublin (city)
Republic of Ireland association footballers
Crumlin United F.C. players
Bohemian F.C. players
Hamilton Academical F.C. players
Limerick F.C. players
Shelbourne F.C. players
Drogheda United F.C. players
Dundalk F.C. players
Bray Wanderers F.C. players
Galway United F.C. players
Scottish Premier League players
League of Ireland players
Association football midfielders
Republic of Ireland youth international footballers